The Society of Wetland Scientists (SWS) is an international, professional non-profit organization devoted to promoting understanding, conservation, protection, restoration, science-based management, and sustainability of wetlands. Society membership is open to anyone with an interest in wetlands. Based in Madison, Wisconsin, United States, it has 3000+ members worldwide.

SWS has sixteen regional chapters around the world: Alaska, Asia, Canada, Central, China, Europe, International, Mid-Atlantic, New England, North Central, Oceania, Pacific Northwest, Rocky Mountain, South Atlantic, South Central, and Western. SWS has nine sections that organize symposia and workshops for the SWS Annual Meeting: Biogeochemistry, Education, Global Change Ecology, Peatlands, Public Policy and Regulation, Ramsar, Wildlife, Wetland Restoration, and Women in Wetlands.

SWS has been managed by an association management company, AMPED Association Management, since 2010. SWS is associated with the SWS Professional Certification Program, which works "to identify qualified individuals to assess and manage the Nation’s resources." The certification program is run by a separate office and collects separate membership dues. Certification signifies that the academic and work experience of a Professional Wetland Scientist (PWS) meets the standards expected by his or her peers of a practicing wetland professional and provides acknowledgment to his or her peers of adherence to standards of professional ethics with regard to the conduct and practice of wetland science. PWS certification is awarded for those meeting both educational and experience requirements. Wetland Professional in Training (WPIT) is considered a preliminary step for persons who meet the basic educational requirements but not the experience requirements.

SWS was founded in March 1980 by Richard Macomber, a biologist with the United States Army Corps of Engineers Board of Rivers and Harbors. That same year, the first SWS Annual Meeting was held in Tampa, Florida, United States. The first president of SWS was James F. Parnell from the University of North Carolina Wilmington. The first issue of Wetlands, the Society's premier, international journal, was published in 1981 as proceedings for the Annual Meeting. Since that time, Wetlands has evolved into a quarterly journal, communicating research to an expanding community of international and interdisciplinary wetland professionals. It is currently published by Springer on behalf of the SWS.

Lake Ohrid and Studenchishte Marsh 
Since 2015, the SWS Europe Chapter has been encouraging more robust protection for the Republic of North Macedonia's Lake Ohrid, one of the most biodiverse inland waters on Earth, and the last remains of a previously extensive wetland along its shore, Studenchishte Marsh. Alongside supporting an initiative by local organizations EDEN and Ohrid SOS to establish both areas jointly as a Wetland of International Importance under the Ramsar Convention, SWS has also released a Declaration on the Protection of the Lake Ohrid Ecosystem, which outlines the importance of the location and proposes various measures for its protection, revitalization and sustainable development.

References

Nature conservation organizations based in the United States
Scientific societies based in the United States
Organizations based in Madison, Wisconsin
Wetland conservation in the United States
Wetlands organizations